The Independent Democratic Action is a political party in São Tomé and Príncipe. It was established in 1994 by the then president Miguel Trovoada and is a politically centrist party.

It took part in the 29 July 2001 presidential elections, in which its candidate, Fradique de Menezes, won 55.2% of the vote and was elected president. After the elections Fradique de Menezes joined a new party - the Force for Change Democratic Movement-Liberal Party. In the legislative election held on 3 March 2002, the Independent Democratic Action was the main party in the Uê Kédadji alliance, that won 16.2% of the popular vote and 8 out of 55 seats. It left this alliance and won in the 2006 election 11 out of 55 seats. In the July 2006 presidential election, its leader Patrice Trovoada ran as the only major opposition candidate, but he was defeated by Menezes.

Trovoada became Prime Minister in February 2008, but was defeated in a May 2008 vote of confidence proposed by the Movement for the Liberation of São Tomé and Príncipe/Social Democratic Party (MLSTP/PSD), and in June Menezes asked the MLSTP/PSD to form a new government. The ADI denounced Menezes' designation of the MLSTP/PSD to form a government as unconstitutional, arguing that it was too late in the parliamentary term to do so, and it took the matter to the Supreme Tribunal of Justice.

Evaristo Carvalho has been the President of São Tomé and Príncipe from 2016 to 2021, after defeating the incumbent President Manuel Pinto da Costa in the 2016 elections. President Carvalho was also Vice president of the ruling Independent Democratic Action party (ADI). Patrice Trovoada was Prime Minister from 2014 to 2018 as the leader of Independent Democratic Action party (ADI).

References

Political parties in São Tomé and Príncipe
Political parties established in 1992
Main
Centrist parties in Africa